Sanganabhatla Harish Shankar (born 31 March 1979) is an Indian film director and screenwriter known for his works exclusively in Telugu cinema, and Telugu theater. He made his directorial debut with Shock (2006), produced by Ram Gopal Varma.

He has directed Mirapakay (2011), Gabbar Singh (2012); for which he received the SIIMA Award for Best Director, and CineMAA Award for Best Director. Gabbar Singh grossed  worldwide, becoming one of the highest grossing Telugu films at the time.

Early life
Harish Shankar was born in Dharmapuri, Telangana and was brought up in BHEL Township, Hyderabad. He has an younger brother, Vishnu Prasad, and a younger sister. He studied at Osmania University.

Film craft
Shankar started stage acting with Seeta Nilayam and Lalitha kala Mandiram, based in Telangana. He then began writing and screenwriting. He is influenced by Yandamuri Veerendranath's works and is interested in dialects, regional and linguistic influences. He was associated with Kona Venkat, Puri Jagannadh, Ram Gopal Varma, and has worked as an associate director for films such as Ninne Istapaddanu and Veede.

Filmography

Director

Screenwriter

Actor

References

External links

Living people
1977 births
Film directors from Telangana
Telugu film directors
People from Karimnagar
Indian male screenwriters
Telugu screenwriters
Telugu male actors
Indian male film actors
Indian male stage actors
Telugu-language lyricists
Osmania University alumni
21st-century Indian film directors
Film directors from Andhra Pradesh
21st-century Indian dramatists and playwrights
Screenwriters from Andhra Pradesh
South Indian International Movie Awards winners
CineMAA Awards winners
21st-century Indian male writers